Giulia Lama (1 October 1681 – 7 October 1747)  was an Italian painter, active in Venice. Her dark, tense style contrasted with the dominant pastel colors of the late Baroque era.

Biography
Lama was born in the parish of Santa Maria Formosa in Venice. She was trained initially by her father, the painter Agostino Lama. She may have studied alongside a childhood friend, Giambattista Piazzetta (1682–1754), at the Scuola di Antonio Molinari in Venice. As a result of learning together their styles are similar in the sharp contrasts of light and shade. Piazzetta  painted a portrait of his friend in c.1715–1720.

A letter written by the Abate Conti to Madame de Caylus in March 1728 has been important in determining Lama's background and character. He remarks, "The poor girl is persecuted by the painters, but her virtue triumphs over her enemies. It is true that she is as ugly as she is witty but she speaks with grace and precision, so that one easily forgives her her face." The letter reveals that in addition to being a painter she was skilled in mathematics, poetry, and lace making. 

Lama was active as a historical painter and poet in Venice. One of her pieces, a Crucifixion altarpiece, remains in situ at San Vitale. Further works, one of St Matthew and another of St Mark, completed around the end of the 1720s are in San Marziale church in central Venice. She had a successful career in private and public figure painting. Lama appears to have been one of the first women to break the barrier against women studying and drawing the nude figure from life. Over 200 drawings show that she indeed studied both male and female nude figures during her training. She had public success in a style that was typically a position held by men, giving rise to opposition from her male counterparts who were not prepared to tolerate such competition.

As a highly trained professional, she was just as capable of painting a sensitive portrait such as Young Man with a Turban as she was of carrying out large, original commissions, such as altarpieces, with confidence. It is through the identification of three such altarpieces in a Venetian guidebook of 1733 that Lama's artistic personality began to be reconstructed. That she was as fully competent as the male artists with whom she competed is demonstrated by the names to which her work has been attributed. Recovery of Lama's oeuvre has required reattribution of works by not only Piazzetta, but also artists such as Federico Bencovich, Domenico Maggiotto, Francesco Capella, and Zurbarán among others.

References

 

1681 births
1747 deaths
18th-century Italian painters
Painters from Venice
Italian women painters
18th-century Italian women artists
18th-century Venetian people
18th-century Venetian women